The 2012–13 Columbus Blue Jackets season was the 13th season for the National Hockey League (NHL) franchise that was established on June 25, 1997. The regular season was reduced from its usual 82 games to 48 due to a lockout.

Despite a big improvement, the Blue Jackets failed to qualify for the Stanley Cup playoffs .

Off-season

Regular season
On February 12, 2013, the Blue Jackets fired general manager Scott Howson after years of disappointing hockey in Columbus. On February 13, Jarmo Kekalainen was hired as his replacement. With his hiring, Kekalainen became the first European GM in NHL history. The team picked up steam after the change at general manager, going 20–10–5 to end the season just narrowly missing out on a playoff spot.

Standings

Schedule and results

Player statistics
Final stats 
Skaters

Goaltenders

†Denotes player spent time with another team before joining the Blue Jackets.  Stats reflect time with the Blue Jackets only.
‡Traded mid-season
Bold/italics denotes franchise record

Awards and records

Awards

Transactions 
The Blue Jackets have been involved in the following transactions during the 2012–13 season.

Trades 

|}

Free agents signed

Free agents lost

Claimed via waivers

Lost via waivers

Lost via retirement

Player signings

2012 Draft picks 
Columbus' picks at the 2012 NHL Entry Draft in Pittsburgh, Pennsylvania. 

Draft notes
Pick 30 – Los Angeles will send its first-round pick in the 2012 or 2013 NHL Draft to Columbus, at Columbus' option.
 The Blue Jackets' fourth-round pick went to the Pittsburgh Penguins as the result of a November 8, 2011, trade that sent Mark Letestu to the Blue Jackets in exchange for this pick.
  The Vancouver Canucks fourth-round pick went to the Columbus Blue Jackets as a result of a February 27, 2012, trade that sent Samuel Pahlsson to the Canucks in exchange for this pick.
 The Blue Jackets' fifth-round pick went to the Montreal Canadiens as the result of a June 29, 2011, trade that sent James Wisniewski to the Blue Jackets in exchange for this conditional pick (fifth round if Blue Jackets re-sign Wisniewski, else seventh round).

See also 
 2012–13 NHL season

References

Columbus Blue Jackets seasons
Columbus Blue Jackets season, 2012-13
Columbus
Blue
Blue